Linda Thomas-Greenfield (born 1952) is an American diplomat who is the United States ambassador to the United Nations under President Joe Biden. She served as the U.S. assistant secretary of state for African affairs from 2013 to 2017. Thomas-Greenfield then worked in the private sector as a senior vice president at Albright Stonebridge Group in Washington, D.C.

President Biden nominated her to be the U.S. ambassador to the United Nations, and she was confirmed by the United States Senate on February 23, 2021. She took office after presenting her credentials on February 25, 2021.

Early life and education
Thomas-Greenfield was born in 1952 in Baker, Louisiana. She earned a Bachelor of Arts degree from Louisiana State University in 1974, and a Master of Public Administration from the University of Wisconsin–Madison in 1975. During UW-Madison's spring 2018 commencement ceremony, Thomas-Greenfield was awarded an honorary Doctor of Law by Chancellor Rebecca Blank.

Career
Thomas-Greenfield taught political science at Bucknell University, before joining the Foreign Service in 1982.
 
She served as Deputy Assistant Secretary, Bureau of Population, Refugees and Migration (2004–2006), Principal Deputy Assistant Secretary for African Affairs (2006–2008), Ambassador to Liberia (2008–2012), and Director General of the Foreign Service and concurrently as the Director of Human Resources (2012–2013). In addition, Thomas-Greenfield held foreign postings in Switzerland (at the United States Mission to the United Nations), Pakistan, Kenya, The Gambia, Nigeria, and Jamaica.

From 2013 to 2017, she served as the Assistant Secretary of State for African Affairs in the United States Department of State's Bureau of African Affairs.

In 2017 she was terminated by the Trump administration as part of what was a "purge of senior State Department officials and career professionals over nearly four years", according to the Los Angeles Times.

Thomas-Greenfield is a non-resident fellow at Georgetown University, having been the distinguished resident fellow in African Studies from fall 2017 to spring 2019.

In November 2020, Thomas-Greenfield was named a volunteer member of President-elect Joe Biden's agency review team to support transition efforts related to the United States Department of State. , Thomas-Greenfield was on leave from a senior vice president position at Albright Stonebridge Group.

U.S. Ambassador to the United Nations

On November 24, 2020, Biden announced his plans to nominate her as the next U.S. Ambassador to the United Nations, and to include her in his cabinet and National Security Council. She appeared before the Senate Committee on Foreign Relations on January 27, 2021. During the confirmation hearing on her nomination for U.N. ambassador, Thomas-Greenfield said she regretted giving a speech to a Beijing-backed Confucius Institute in 2019 when she was working for a private consulting firm. She largely agreed with the Senate Foreign Relations Committee on international policies, raising concerns about the People's Republic of China's "malign force" and "debt traps and tactics" in Africa and beyond. In February 2021, it was reported that Senator Ted Cruz of Texas was delaying a committee vote on her nomination due to her 2019 comments on the People's Republic of China. Thomas-Greenfield has vowed to stand "against the unfair targeting of Israel" for Boycott, Divestment, and Sanctions, saying that the movement "verges on antisemitism".

The committee favorably reported her nominations on February 4, 2021. Thomas-Greenfield was confirmed by the United States Senate on February 23, 2021, by a 78–20 vote to be the UN Ambassador; she was subsequently confirmed, by a vote of 78–21, to be the US representative to the General Assembly of the UN. She took office after presenting her credentials on February 25, 2021. She succeeded Ambassador Kelly Craft.

Tenure

Beginning on March 1, 2021, the United States became president of the United Nations Security Council; thus Greenfield became president of the council as head of the United States delegation. Her term ended on March 31, 2021. Her next term as President of the UNSC began on May 1, 2022, succeeding her UK counterpart, Barbara Woodward, who served as UNSC President for April 2022, in the middle of the continuing war in Ukraine by Russia, and ended on May 31, 2022, being succeeded by the Albanian ambassador, Ferit Hoxha, for June 2022.

Thomas-Greenfield accused the People's Republic of China of committing genocide against Uyghurs and of detaining more than one million Uyghurs and other ethnic minorities in Xinjiang internment camps. She said that the United States "will keep standing up and speaking out until China's government stops its crimes against humanity and the genocide of Uyghurs and other minorities in Xinjiang."

She expressed concern over reports of escalating ethnic tensions in Ethiopia's Tigray Region and urged peaceful resolution of the Tigray War between Ethiopia's federal government and the forces of the Tigray regional government.

Publications

See also
List of African-American United States Cabinet members
List of female United States Cabinet members

References

External links

Ambassador Linda Thomas-Greenfield

|-

|-

|-

|-

1952 births
21st-century American diplomats
African-American diplomats
African-American members of the Cabinet of the United States
Ambassadors of the United States to Liberia
American women ambassadors
Assistant Secretaries of State for African Affairs
Biden administration cabinet members
Bucknell University faculty
Directors General of the United States Foreign Service
Living people
Louisiana State University alumni 
People from Baker, Louisiana
Permanent Representatives of the United States to the United Nations
Robert M. La Follette School of Public Affairs alumni
Women members of the Cabinet of the United States
21st-century American women
American women diplomats